Karchha railway station is a small railway station in Ujjain district, Madhya Pradesh. Its code is KDHA. It serves Narwar town. The station consists of one platform, not well sheltered. It lacks many facilities including water and sanitation.

Major trains 
Some of the important trains that run from Karchha are:
 Ujjain–Indore Passenger
 Indore–Jaipur Express via Ajmer
 Indore–Nagda Passenger
 Narmada Express
 Ratlam–Indore BG Passenger
 Indore–Ajmer Link Express

References

Railway stations in Ujjain district
Ratlam railway division